Harrell is a town in Calhoun County, Arkansas, United States. The population was 254 at the 2010 census. It is part of the Camden Micropolitan Statistical Area.

Geography

Demographics

As of the census of 2000, there were 293 people, 120 households, and 81 families residing in the city. The racial makeup of the city was 43.00% White, 56.31% Black or African American, and 0.68% from two or more races.

There were 120 households, out of which 32.5% had children under the age of 18 living with them, 43.3% were married couples living together, 20.8% had a female householder with no husband present, and 32.5% were non-families. 28.3% of all households were made up of individuals, and 13.3% had someone living alone who was 65 years of age or older.  The average household size was 2.44 and the average family size was 2.94.

In the city the population was spread out, with 28.3% under the age of 18, 9.2% from 18 to 24, 27.3% from 25 to 44, 19.8% from 45 to 64, and 15.4% who were 65 years of age or older.  The median age was 34 years. For every 100 females, there were 83.1 males.  For every 100 females age 18 and over, there were 75.0 males.

The median income for a household in the city was $21,875, and the median income for a family was $33,333. Males had a median income of $30,500 versus $14,500 for females. The per capita income for the city was $12,539.  About 15.0% of families and 23.5% of the population were below the poverty line, including 25.3% of those under the age of eighteen and 20.0% of those 65 or over.

Education 
Public education is available via the Hampton School District based in Hampton, with students graduating from Hampton High School. The school district encompasses  of land including all of Hampton and portions of several Calhoun County communities including Camden, Harrell, and Tinsman.

References

Towns in Calhoun County, Arkansas
Towns in Arkansas
Camden, Arkansas micropolitan area